At the 2011 Pan Arab Games, the sailing events were held at Doha Sailing Club in Doha, Qatar from 14–20 December. A total of 6 events were contested.

Medal summary

Men

Women

Open

Medal table

References

External links
Sailing at official website

Pan Arab Games
Sailing
2011 Pan Arab Games
Sailing competitions in Qatar